2009 Faroe Islands Premier League, also known as Vodafonedeildin for sponsoring reasons, was the sixty-seventh season of top-tier football on the Faroe Islands. It began on 4 April 2009 and ended on 3 October 2009. EB/Streymur were the defending champions. The league was won by HB Tórshavn.

Team changes from the previous season
B71 Sandoy and Skála ÍF were relegated to 1. deild after finishing 9th and 10th in the 2008 season. They were replaced by 1. deild champions 07 Vestur and runners-up AB Argir.

Overview

League table

Results
The schedule consisted of a total of 27 games. Each team played three games against every opponent in no particular order. At least one of the games was at home and one was away. The additional home game for every match-up was randomly assigned prior to the season.

Regular home games

Additional home games

Top goalscorers

Source: soccerandequipment.com

19 goals
 Finnur Justinussen (Víkingur Gøta)

17 goals
 Arnbjørn Hansen (EB/Streymur)

15 goals
 Ameth Keita (B68 Toftir)

14 goals
 Andrew av Fløtum (HB Tórshavn)
 Károly Potemkin (NSÍ Runavík)

12 goals
 Hjalgrím Elttør (KÍ Klaksvík (5) / NSÍ Runavík (7))

10 goals
 Fróði Benjaminsen (HB Tórshavn)
 Jens Erik Rasmussen (07 Vestur)

9 goals
 Christian Høgni Jacobsen (NSÍ Runavík)
 Bogi Løkin (NSÍ Runavík)
 Andy Olsen (ÍF Fuglafjørður)
 Rógvi Poulsen (HB Tórshavn)

See also
 2009 Faroe Islands Cup

External links
 Official website 
 Faroe Islands soccer news, results and information

Faroe Islands Premier League seasons
1
Faroe
Faroe